Pye Green BT Tower is a  tall telecommunication tower built of reinforced concrete at Pye Green, Staffordshire, England. Standing on the far southern edge of Cannock Chase, it is one of fourteen telecommunication towers in the United Kingdom built of reinforced concrete. Pye Green was constructed as part of the British Cold War "Backbone" radio communications network.

Its combination of elevation and height give it line-of-sight to the BT Tower in Birmingham and Sutton Common in Cheshire.

Services available

Analogue radio (FM VHF)

Digital radio (DAB)

See also 
British Telecom microwave network
Telecommunications towers in the United Kingdom

References 
 
 Campbell, D., 1983. War Plan UK, p243, p245. Paladin edition. .
 Laurie, P., 1983. Beneath the City Streets, p. 243, p. 246. Granada edition. .
 The National Archives (UK), 1956–1962. Proposed relay station sites for the General Post Office ("The Backbone Scheme"). File No. COU1/38.
 Fox, S., and Lamont, R., 2003. The Towers of Backbone.

External links 
The Transmission Gallery: photographs, coverage maps and information

Towers in Staffordshire
Cannock Chase
Communication towers in the United Kingdom
British Telecom buildings and structures
Transmitter sites in England